The Touqian River is a river in northern Taiwan.

See also
List of rivers in Taiwan

References

Rivers of Taiwan
Landforms of Hsinchu County